Colbún Hydroelectric Plant is a hydroelectric power station in Maule Region, Chile. The plant uses water from Colbún Lake and produces  (or 474 MW) of electricity.

References

Energy infrastructure completed in 1985
Energy infrastructure in Maule Region
Hydroelectric power stations in Chile